Sir Richard Brinsley Ford  (10 June 1908 – 4 May 1999) was a British art historian, scholar, and collector. He inherited a large collection of art from his family and was himself an avid collector. A drawing that he purchased in 1936 was sold by his estate for $12 million in 2000. Ford was the director of the Burlington Magazine, president of Walpole Society and chaired the National Art Collections Fund. During World War II he was a Troop Sergeant-Major in the Royal Artillery and then served in the military intelligence organisation, MI9.

Personal life
Richard Brinsley Ford was born in 1908 in Petworth, Sussex to Captain Richard Ford (1860–1940) and Rosamund Isabel Ramsden (1872–1911). His father was an officer for the British Army, who inherited in 1917 a large art collection that had been assembled by his great great grandfather, Richard Ford (1758–1806) and his maternal great-grandfather, Benjamin Booth. Gustav Waagen describes the collection in Treasures of Art in Great Britain. Richard Ford, his great grandfather, wrote travel books on Spain. The Irish playwright Richard Brinsley Sheridan was an ancestor.

Ford attended Eton College. He then studied modern history at Trinity College, Oxford and graduated in 1930. In 1937 Ford married a distant cousin, Joan Mary Vyvyan who was born in 1910. The couple had one daughter and two sons. He died of a heart attack at his home in London on 4 May 1999.

Early art collection

In 1927 Ford joined the National Art Collections Fund. His maternal grandmother left him a legacy two years later with which Ford was able to begin collecting art, including the works of Fuseli, Michelangelo, Ingres, Toulouse-Lautrec, and Henry Moore. He met art connoisseur James Byam Shaw and artist Charles Barrow Prescott when he joined the Burlington Fine Arts Club. In 1939 he published a scholarly article in the Burlington Magazine of portrait drawings made by Ingres. His father died in 1940 and the following year he took possession of his father's art collection.

World War II
In 1939, before World War II began, Ford became Troop Sergeant-Major in the Royal Artillery of the British Army. He was transferred to MI9 military intelligence in 1941 and later headed the Brussels office.

Career
Ford amassed an art collection that was held at his house at Wyndham Place. He added works by Batoni, Cozza, Cavallino, creating a collection of Italian seicento and settecento works. In 1951 he published The Drawings of Richard Wilson.

During the war years the Burlington Magazine floundered but Ford rallied support and himself provided financial assistance to the journal. In its tribute to him following his death, the magazine wrote that he was "the principal engineers of this Magazine's survival in the lean years that followed World War II." In 1952 became its director. In 1954 he became a trustee of the National Gallery.

He became a member of the National Art Collections Fund executive committee in 1974 and its chair in 1975. Under his leadership more than 200 works of art were saved and National Trust properties received art work. He organised an exhibition, "Richard Ford in Spain", lent works and assisted Denys Sutton in the development of the exhibition catalog. He was chairman until 1980.

In 1984, Ford was knighted for his work. Two years later he became the Walpole Society president, having stepped down from the Burlington Magazine. The society published a catalog of his collection in 1998.

Dictionary of British and Irish Travellers in Italy, 1701-1800 
Interested in men who had made the grand tour to Italy, Ford began accumulating information for a dictionary in the 1950s. A Dictionary of British and Irish Travellers in Italy, 1701–1800, written by John Ingamells was published in 1997.

Archive and library 
Ford's archive on British and Irish travellers to Italy, from which the Dictionary was written, is in the Paul Mellon Centre's archive for public consultation. The archive includes research notes, correspondence, transcriptions and copies of original sources, photocopies of published material, publications and photographs. The main sequence of material is reference material in an alphabetical run of British and Irish travellers that includes artists, antiquaries, collectors and the nobility. Ford's archive also comprises material on foreign travellers and general subjects covering the arts, taste and patronage and Ford's unpublished typescript Aspects of the Grand Tour.

In 2008, the family of the late Sir Brinsley Ford donated approximately 250 exhibition catalogues on 20th-century artists and on the subject of the Grand Tour to the Paul Mellon Centre library.

Ford art collection
Benjamin Booth, Brinsley's ancestor, began collecting works of art in the 18th century, most notably the bulk of Richard Wilson's English landscapes. It was further enhanced when Marianne, his daughter, was married to Richard Ford. Brinsley Ford added paintings, sculptures and ceramics to the collection. Works were made during the Baroque and Renaissance periods, including works of Old Masters. He has works of students of the Royal Academy of Arts that line the walls of his bedroom, from floor to ceiling. Ford enjoyed the tours he gave of the collection at his Wyndham Place house. He provided background stories about his collection, given with "the measured cadences of Edward Gibbon with the humorous sparkle of Horace Walpole" as he took visitors through rooms that held collection items.

The Brinsley Ford estate sold a drawing of what became Michelangelo's Cristo della Minerva statue, through Christie's, to a German art dealer for $12,378,500. The drawing, purchased by Ford in 1936, was used as inspiration for the statue located at the Church of Santa Maria sopra Minerva in Rome that was commissioned in 1514. It was sold for nearly $5 million more than the previous price paid for a Michelangelo work, the Woman of Camaria in 1998. In 1936, Ford was criticised for spending about 3,000 guineas for a drawing of Michelangelo's; his aunt felt it was extravagant since he paid about what it would cost for a home at that time. That story was often one of the tidbits that Ford shared on his tours with visitors.

The Walpole Society's 60th-anniversary edition was dedicated to the Ford Art Collection.

Exhibitions
A few of the exhibitions of the collection are:
after 1951 – Drawings of Richard Wilson, loaned worldwide for exhibitions
1974 – "Richard Ford in Spain", shown in London and Birmingham
2011 – The Granary Art Gallery, Weston Park
long term loan - 'At Home with Art – Treasures from the Brinsley Ford Collection', Basildon Park

Published works
Author

Co-author

References

External links 
 Dictionary of Art Historians entry for Sir Richard Brinsley Ford
 The Brinsley Ford Archive at the Paul Mellon Centre
 Obituary, The Independent May 1999

Further reading
 
 
 
 
 
 

1908 births
1999 deaths
British Army personnel of World War II
Military personnel from Sussex
People educated at Eton College
Alumni of Trinity College, Oxford
Commanders of the Order of the British Empire
Knights Bachelor
Royal Artillery personnel
British art historians
British art collectors
20th-century British historians